Guatemala competed at the 2004 Summer Olympics in Athens, Greece, from 13 to 29 August 2004. This was the nation's eleventh appearance at the Summer Olympics, excluding three occasions after its national debut at the 1952 Summer Olympics in Helsinki.

Athletics 

Guatemalan athletes have so far achieved qualifying standards in the following athletics events (up to a maximum of 3 athletes in each event at the 'A' Standard, and 1 at the 'B' Standard).

Men

Women

Badminton 

Guatemala has qualified a badminton player in the men's singles.

Cycling

Road
Men

Track
Keirin

Modern pentathlon

Guatemala has qualified a single athlete in modern pentathlon.

Shooting 

Men

Swimming 

Guatemalan swimmers earned qualifying standards in the following events (up to a maximum of 2 swimmers in each event at the A-standard time, and 1 at the B-standard time):

Men

Women

Taekwondo

Weightlifting

See also
 Guatemala at the 2003 Pan American Games
 Guatemala at the 2004 Summer Paralympics

References

External links
Official Report of the XXVIII Olympiad
Guatemalan Olympic Committee 

Nations at the 2004 Summer Olympics
2004
Summer Olympics